Delaware Avenue Historic District is a national historic district located at Buffalo, New York, United States, and Erie County.  It is located along the west side of Delaware Avenue (New York State Route 384) between North Street to the South and Bryant Street to the North.

History
When listed on the National Register of Historic Places in 1974, the district encompassed 17 contributing buildings and 1 contributing structure reflective of when Buffalo had more millionaires per capita than any city in America, and this was once Millionaires' Mile.  The mansions were built between about 1890 and World War I and reflect Renaissance Revival and Gothic Revival style architecture.

Notable extant buildings
Notable buildings include:

 672 Delaware Avenue - The Williams-Butler House (1896) by McKim, Mead & White
 690 Delaware Avenue - The Williams-Pratt House (1896) by McKim, Mead & White
 724 Delaware Avenue - The Westminster Presbyterian Church (1859) by Harlow W. Wilcox
 786 Delaware Avenue - The Clement House (1914) by Edward Brodhead Green (now Greater Buffalo American Red Cross Building)
 800 Delaware Avenue - The Mrs. Seymour H. Knox House (1915) by C. P. H. Gilbert (formerly 806 Delaware Avenue)
 830 Delaware Avenue - The George Brewster Mathews House (1901)
 844 Delaware Avenue - The Thomas B. Lockwood House (1888)
 864 Delaware Avenue - The Harlow C. Curtiss House (1898) by Esenwein & Johnson (today the International Institute of Buffalo)
 888 Delaware Avenue - The Charles W. Goodyear House (1903) by E.B. Green (formerly Bishop McMahon High School and Oracle Charter School)

It was listed on the National Register of Historic Places in 1974.

Gallery

Demolished residences

See also
National Register of Historic Places listings in Erie County, New York

References
Notes

Sources

External links

672 Delaware Avenue - Williams-Butler House / Jacobs Executive Development Center
690 Delaware Avenue - Williams-Pratt House / LiRo Group Building
724 Delaware Avenue - Westminster Presbyterian Church
786 Delaware Avenue - Clement House / Red Cross Building
800 Delaware Avenue - Knox House / Computer Task Group Building
824 Delaware Avenue - Forman-Cabana House / Conners Children's Center
830 Delaware Avenue - Matthews House
844 Delaware Avenue - Richmond-Lockwood House / Conners Children's Center
864 Delaware Avenue - Curtiss House / International Institute
888 Delaware Avenue - Charles W. Goodyear House / Oracle Charter School

Historic districts in Buffalo, New York
Gothic Revival architecture in New York (state)
Renaissance Revival architecture in New York (state)
Historic districts on the National Register of Historic Places in New York (state)
National Register of Historic Places in Buffalo, New York
Upper class culture in New York (state)